The Burmese–Siamese wars also known as the Yodian wars, were a series of wars fought between Burma and Siam from the 16th to 19th centuries.

Toungoo (Burma)–Ayutthaya (Siam)

Konbaung (Burma)–Ayutthaya (Siam)

Konbaung (Burma)–Thonburi (Siam)

Konbaung (Burma)–Rattanakosin (Siam)

See more
 Burma–Thailand relations
 Military history of Myanmar
 Military history of Thailand
 History of Burma
 History of Thailand
 List of wars involving Myanmar
 List of wars involving Thailand
 Siamese–Vietnamese wars

Citations

References

 

 
 

Burmese–Siamese wars
Wars involving Myanmar
Wars involving Thailand
Wars involving the Ayutthaya Kingdom
Wars involving the Thonburi Kingdom
Wars involving the Rattanakosin Kingdom
Military history of Myanmar
Military history of Thailand
Myanmar–Thailand relations